Moiseyev, Moiseev or Moisseev is a Russian masculine last name. Its feminine counterpart is Moiseyeva, Moiseeva or Moisseeva. It may refer to:

Aleksandr Alekseyevich Moiseyev (born 1962), Russian naval officer
Aleksandr Moiseyev (basketball) (1927–2003), Russian basketball player
Alex Moiseyev (born 1959), Russian draughts champion 
Andrey Moiseyev (born 1979), Russian Olympic athlete
Boris Moiseev (1954–2022), Russian dancer
Igor Moiseyev (1906–2007), Russian choreographer
Jack Moiseyev, American horse trainer
Leonid Moiseyev (born 1948), Russian diplomat
Mikhail Moiseyev (1939–2022), Russian military officer 
Nikolay Moiseyev (1902–1955), Russian astronomer
Nikita Moiseyev (1917–2000), Russian mathematics theorist
Roman Moiseyev (born 1960), Russian composer
Sergei Moiseyev (born 1959), Russian footballer
Vladimir Aleksandrovich Moiseyev (born 1988), Russian footballer 
Yuri Alekseyevich Moiseyev (born 1960), Russian football player
Yuri Moiseev (1940–2005), Russian ice hockey player
Irina Moiseeva (born 1955), Russian ice dancer
Maria Moiseeva, Uzbekistani football midfielder
Tatiana Moiseeva (born 1981), Russian biathlete
Victoria Moiseeva (born 1991), Russian curler